Paulo Martorano (born 3 May 1933) is a Brazilian footballer. He played in one match for the Brazil national football team in 1957. He was also part of Brazil's squad for the 1956 South American Championship.

References

1933 births
Living people
Brazilian footballers
Brazil international footballers
Place of birth missing (living people)
Association football goalkeepers
São Paulo FC players
Guarani FC players
Brazilian expatriate footballers
Expatriate footballers in Mexico